Dele is a proofreading symbol.

Dele may also refer to:

 Dele (name), a given name and surname
 DELE (Diplomas de Español como Lengua Extranjera), diplomas given from a standardized test

See also
 Deel (disambiguation)
 N'Délé, a market town and sub prefecture in Central African Republic